Harshitha Samarawickrama (born 29 June 1998) is a Sri Lankan cricketer who plays for Sri Lanka's women's cricket team. She made her One Day International (ODI) debut against Australia on 20 September 2016.

In November 2019, she was named as the captain of Sri Lanka's squad for the women's cricket tournament at the 2019 South Asian Games. The Sri Lankan team won the silver medal, after losing to Bangladesh by two runs in the final. In January 2020, she was named as the vice-captain of Sri Lanka's squad for the 2020 ICC Women's T20 World Cup in Australia.

In October 2021, she was named as the vice-captain of Sri Lanka's team for the 2021 Women's Cricket World Cup Qualifier tournament in Zimbabwe. In January 2022, she was named as the vice-captain of Sri Lanka's team for the 2022 Commonwealth Games Cricket Qualifier tournament in Malaysia. In July 2022, she was named in Sri Lanka's team for the cricket tournament at the 2022 Commonwealth Games in Birmingham, England.

References

External links

 

1998 births
Living people
Cricketers from Colombo
Sri Lankan women cricketers
Sri Lanka women One Day International cricketers
Sri Lanka women Twenty20 International cricketers
South Asian Games silver medalists for Sri Lanka
South Asian Games medalists in cricket
Cricketers at the 2022 Commonwealth Games
Commonwealth Games competitors for Sri Lanka